Power of love is a 2002 Nigerian romantic film all about betrayal, love, and forgiveness. It was directed by Tarila Thompson and written by Chuks Obiorah.

Cast 
Ramsey Noah as Chris
Genevieve Nneji as Juliet
Steph-Nora Okere as Sandra
Ifeanyi Odikaesie as Ejike
Tony Goodman as Doctor Wilson
Ashley Nwosu as Mr Gideon
Florence Onuma as Mrs. Gideon
Carol Okeke as Evelyn
Evelyn Osugo as Brenda
Grace Amah as Rose
Theodor Ochonogor as Franca
Chimme Anns as Candy
Val Agwulomu as Ekin
Evita Eyo Ita as Michael
Jude Ezenwa as Fred
Aruna Kadiri as Okey
Uche Anaje as Austin
Chinyere Akujobi as Home maid

Plot 
Sandra, Chris' Ex hit Juliet and run away from the accident scene. Chris needed some money to travel abroad so he went to Sandra who didn't believe in his dream. It was paralysed Juliet who later sponsored the trip and this made Chris determined to marry her. However his parents rejected the lady saying she is disabled and he ended up marrying sandra. After Juliet got to know Sandra was behind her accident, they all fought of which Sandra ended up dead and Chris married Juliet at the end.

References 

Nigerian romance films
2002 films
English-language Nigerian films
2000s English-language films